

Walter Melzer (7 October 1894 – 23 June 1961) was a general in the Wehrmacht of Nazi Germany during World War II who commanded the XXIII corps. He was a recipient of the Knight's Cross of the Iron Cross with Oak Leaves.

Awards and decorations
 Iron Cross (1914) 2nd Class (9 August 1915) & 1st Class (10 March 1918)
 Clasp to the Iron Cross (1939) 2nd Class (16 September 1939) & 1st Class (3 October 1939)
 German Cross in Gold on 11 February 1943 as Oberst in Grenadier-Regiment 694
 Knight's Cross of the Iron Cross with Oak Leaves
 Knight's Cross on 21 August 1941 as Oberst and commander of Infanterie-Regiment 151
Oak Leaves on 23 August 1944 as Generalleutnant and commander of 252. Infanterie-Division

References

Notes

Bibliography

 
 
 

1894 births
1961 deaths
Generals of Infantry (Wehrmacht)
German Army personnel of World War I
Recipients of the clasp to the Iron Cross, 1st class
Recipients of the Gold German Cross
Recipients of the Knight's Cross of the Iron Cross with Oak Leaves
Military personnel from Leipzig
People from the Kingdom of Saxony
Reichswehr personnel
German Army generals of World War II